Stanton Long is a civil parish in Shropshire, England.  It contains eight listed buildings that are recorded in the National Heritage List for England.  Of these, one is listed at Grade II*, the middle of the three grades, and the others are at Grade II, the lowest grade.  The parish contains the villages of Stanton Long and Brockton, and is otherwise rural.  Most of the listed buildings are farmhouses, and the other listed buildings consist of a house, a barn, a church, and a hotel.


Key

Buildings

References

Citations

Sources

Lists of buildings and structures in Shropshire